Moon Child is an album led by saxophonist Pharoah Sanders recorded in 1989 and released on the Dutch Timeless label.

Reception

In his review for AllMusic, Steve Loewy commented: "The results may have originally disappointed some of Sanders' fans, but with time the saxophonist clearly reinvented himself as a more traditional improviser capable of thoughtful and pensive deliberations".

The authors of The Penguin Guide to Jazz Recordings called Moon Child "the straightest jazz album [Sanders had] made for years," and noted: "you can readily hear the kind of thing Sanders is after, a hypnotic groove that allows the horn to float almost at will."

Track listing
 "Moon Child" (Pharoah Sanders) - 8:10 		
 "Moon Rays" (Horace Silver) - 6:15 		
 "The Night Has a Thousand Eyes" (Buddy Bernier, Jerry Brainin) - 12:19 
 "All or Nothing at All" (Arthur Altman, Jack Lawrence) - 9:25
 "Soon" (George Gershwin, Ira Gershwin) - 5:31 		
 "Moniebah" (Abdullah Ibrahim) - 10:43

Personnel
Pharoah Sanders - tenor saxophone, soprano saxophone
William Henderson - piano 
Stafford James - bass
Eddie Moore - drums
Cheikh Tidiane Fall - percussion

References

1990 albums
Pharoah Sanders albums
Timeless Records albums